An election was held on November 8, 2022, to elect all 100 members to Montana's House of Representatives. The election coincided with elections for other offices, including the U.S. House of Representatives and state senate. The primary election was held on June 7, 2022. Republicans expanded their supermajority in chamber as they did in the senate.

Retirements

Democrats
District 47: Katharin Kelker retired due to term limits.
District 48: Jessica Karjala retired due to term limits.
District 66: Denise Hayman retired due to term limits.
District 73: Jim Keane retired.
District 79: Robert Farris-Olsen retired.
District 82: Moffie Funk retired due to term limits.
District 84: Mary Ann Dunwell retired due to term limits.
District 95: Danny Tenenbaum retired.
District 98: Willis Curdy retired due to term limits.
District 100: Andrea Olsen retired due to term limits.

Republicans
District 7: Frank Garner retired due to term limits.
District 8: John Fuller retired to run for state senator from District 4.
District 9: Brian Putnam retired.
District 10: Mark Noland retired due to term limits.
District 11: Derek Skees retired due to term limits.
District 19: Wendy McKamey retired due to term limits.
District 26: Jeremy Trebas retired to run for state senator from District 13.
District 30: Wylie Galt retired due to term limits.
District 38: Kenneth Holmlund retired due to term limits.
District 39: Geraldine Custer retired due to term limits.
District 40: Barry Usher retired to run for state senator from District 20.
District 53: Dennis Lenz retired due to term limits.
District 55: Vince Ricci retired due to term limits.
District 58: Seth Berglee retired due to term limits.
District 88: Sharon Greef retired.
District 97: Brad Tschida retired due to term limits.

Predictions

Results summary

Close races
Districts where the margin of victory was under 10%:
District 77, 0.96% gain
District 48, 1% gain
District 15, 1.01%
District 25, 1.75%
District 50, 3.62%
District 42, 5.73%
District 24, 5.97%
District 96, 6.06% gain
District 31, 7.95%
District 84, 7.48%
District 28, 9.06% gain
District 23, 9.83%

Detailed results

Districts 1-20

District 1
Incumbent Republican Steve Gunderson has represented the 1st District since 2017.

District 2
Incumbent Republican Neil Duram has represented the 2nd district since 2019.

District 3
Incumbent Republican Braxton Mitchell has represented the 3rd district since 2021. Loreana Wood is challenging Mitchell for the Republican nomination.

District 4
Incumbent Republican Matt Regier has represented the 4th district since 2017.

District 5
Incumbent Democrat Dave Fern has represented the 5th district since 2017. Brian Owens and Lyn Bennett are seeking the Republican nomination.

District 6
Incumbent Republican Amy Regier has represented the 6th district since 2021.

District 7
Incumbent Republican Frank Garner has represented the 7th district since 2015. garner is term-limited and can't seek re-election. Dave Ingram and Courtenay Sprunger are seeking the Republican nomination.

District 8
Incumbent Republican John Fuller has represented the 8th district since 2019. Fuller is retiring to run for Montana Senate. David Dunn, Terry Falk, Lynne M. (Ogden) Rider, and Mark Twichel are seeking the Republican nomination.

District 9
Incumbent Republican Brian Putnam has represented the 9th district since 2021. Putnam isn't seeking re-election. David August, Tony Brockman, and Constance Neumann are seeking the Republican nomination.

District 10
Incumbent Republican Mark Noland has represented the 10th district since 2015. Noland is term-limited and can't seek re-election.

District 11
Incumbent Republican Derek Skees has represented the 11th district since 2017. Devon Decker, Ronalee Skees, Tanner J. Smith are seeking the Republican nomination.

District 12
Incumbent Republican Linda Reksten has represented the 12th district since 2021.

District 13
Incumbent Republican Paul Fielder has represented the 13th district since 2021.

District 14
Incumbent Republican Denley Loge has represented the 14th district since 2017. Randy D. Mitchell is challenging Loge for the Republican nomination.

District 15
Incumbent Democrat Marvin Weatherwax Jr. has represented the 15th district since 2019. Thedis B. Crowe and Adrian Owen Wagner are challenging Weatherwax for the Democratic nomination. Ralph Foster and Bethsaida (Betsy) Johnson are seeking the Republican nomination.

District 16
Incumbent Democrat Tyson Runningwolf has represented the 16th district since 2019.

District 17
Incumbent Republican Ross Fitzgerald has represented the 17th district since 2017. Justin Cleveland is challenging Fitzgerald for the Republican nomination.

District 18
Incumbent Republican Llew Jones has represented the 18th district since 2019.

District 19
Incumbent Republican Wendy McKamey has represented the 19th district since 2017. McKamey is retiring to run for the Montana Senate.

District 20
Incumbent Republican Fred Anderson has represented the 20th district since 2017.

Districts 21-40

District 21
Incumbent Republican Ed Buttrey has represented the 21st district since 2019.

District 22
Incumbent Republican Lola Sheldon-Galloway has represented the 22nd district since 2017.

District 23
Incumbent Republican Scot Kerns has represented the 23rd district since 2021. Brad Hamlett and Melissa Smith are seeking the Democratic nomination.

District 24
Incumbent Republican Steven Galloway has represented the 24th district since 2021.

District 25
Incumbent Republican Steve Gist has represented the 25th district since 2021.

District 26
Incumbent Republican Jeremy Trebas has represented the 26th district since 2021. Trebas is retiring to run for the Montana Senate. Marci Marceau and George Nikolakakos are seeking the Republican nomination.

District 27
Incumbent Republican Joshua Kassmier has represented the 27th district since 2019.

District 28
Incumbent Republican Ed Hill has represented the 28th district since 2021.

District 29
Incumbent Republican Doug Flament has represented the 29th district since his appointment in 2021.

District 30
Incumbent Republican House Speaker Wylie Galt has represented the 30th district since 2017. Galt is term-limited and can't seek re-election. James H. Bergstrom and Randyn Gregg are seeking the Republican nomination.

District 31
Incumbent Democrat Frank Smith has represented the 31st district since 2021. Kaci Wallette is challenging Smith for the Democratic nomination.

District 32
Incumbent Democrat Jonathan Windy Boy has represented the 32nd district since 2017.

District 33
Incumbent Republican Casey Knudsen has represented the 33rd district since 2017.

District 34
Incumbent Republican Rhonda Knudsen has represented the 34th district since 2019.

District 35
Incumbent Republican Brandon Ler has represented the 35th district since 2021.

District 36
Incumbent Republican Bob Phalen has represented the 36th district since 2021.

District 37
Incumbent Republican Jerry Schillinger has represented the 37th district since 2021.

District 38
Incumbent Republican Kenneth Holmlund has represented the 38th district since 2015. Holmhund is term-limited and can't seek re-election. Wyatt Winchester English, Greg Kmetz, and Mike Willems are seeking the Republican nomination.

District 39
Incumbent Republican Geraldine Custer has represented the 39th district since 2015. Custer is term-limited and is retiring to run for Montana Senate.

District 40
Incumbent Republican Barry Usher has represented the 40th district since 2017. Usher is retiring to run for the Montana Senate. Robert T. (Bob) Goffena, John Nickelson, Greg Oblander, and Bruce Hoiland are seeking the Republican nomination.

Districts 41-60

District 41
Incumbent Democrat Rynalea Whiteman Pena has represented the 41st district since 2021.

District 42
Incumbent Democrat Sharon Stewart-Peregoy has represented the 42nd district since 2017.

District 43
Incumbent Republican Kerri Seekins-Crowe has represented the 43rd district since 2021.

District 44
Incumbent Republican Larry Brewster has represented the 44th district since 2020.

District 45
Incumbent Republican Katie Zolnikov has represented the 45th district since 2020.

District 46
Incumbent Republican Bill Mercer has represented the 46th district since 2019.

District 47
Incumbent Democrat Kathy Kelker has represented the 47th district since 2015. Kelker is term-limited and is retiring to run for the Montana Senate.

District 48
Incumbent Democrat Jessica Karjala has represented the 48th district since 2015. Karjala is term-limited and can't seek re-election.

District 49
Incumbent Democrat Emma Kerr-Carpenter has represented the 49th district since 2018.

District 50
Incumbent Republican Mallerie Stromswold has represented the 50th district since 2021. James Reavis and Erin R. Tate are seeking the Democratic nomination.

District 51
Incumbent Republican Frank Fleming has represented the 51st district since 2018. Fleming isn't seeking re-election.

District 52
Incumbent Republican Sherry Essmann has represented the 52nd district since her appointment on June 11, 2021.

District 53
Incumbent Republican Dennis Lenz has represented the 53rd district since 2017. Lenz is retiring to run for the Montana Senate.

District 54
Incumbent Republican Terry Moore has represented the 54th district since 2019.

District 55
Incumbent Republican Vince Ricci has represented the 55th district since 2015. Ricci is term-limited and can't seek re-election. Lee Deming and Curtis Schomer are seeking the Republican nomination.

District 56
Incumbent Republican Sue Vinton has represented the 56th district since 2017.

District 57
Incumbent Republican Fiona Nave has represented the 57th district since 2021.

District 58
Incumbent Republican Seth Berglee has represented the 58th district since 2015. Berglee is term-limited and can't seek re-election.

District 59
Incumbent Republican Marty Malone has represented the 59th district since 2021.

District 60
Incumbent Democrat Laurie Bishop has represented the 60th district since 2017.

Districts 61-80

District 61
Incumbent Democrat Jim Hamilton has represented the 61st district and its predecessors since 2017.

District 62
Incumbent Democrat Ed Stafman has represented the 62nd district since 2021.

District 63
Incumbent Democrat Alice Buckley has represented the 63rd district since 2021.

District 64
Incumbent Republican Jane Gillette has represented the 64th District since 2021. Alanah Griffith and Michelle vered are seeking the Democratic nomination.

District 65
Incumbent Democrat Kelly Kortum has represented the 65th district since 2021. James Cocco and Ryan Eisele are seeking the Republican nomination.

District 66
Incumbent Democrat Denise Hayman has represented the 66th District since 2015. Hayman is term-limited and is retiring to run for the Montana Senate.

District 67
Incumbent Republican Jedediah Hinkle has represented the 67th District since 2021.

District 68
Incumbent Republican Caleb Hinkle has represented the 68th District since 2021. Former Representative Bruce Grubbs is challenging Hinkle for the Republican nomination.

District 69
Incumbent Republican Jennifer Carlson has represented the 69th District since 2021.

District 70
Incumbent Republican Julie Dooling has represented the 70th District since 2019. Jeremiah Dawson and Jon Jackson are seeking the Democratic nomination.

District 71
Incumbent Republican  Ken Walsh has represented the 71st District since 2021.

District 72
Incumbent Republican Tom Welch has represented the 72nd District since 2017.

District 73
Incumbent Democrat Jim Keane has represented the 73rd District since 2017. Keane isn't seeking re-election.

District 74
Incumbent Democrat Derek Harvey has represented the 74th District since 2019.

District 75
Incumbent Republican Marta Bertoglio has represented the 75th District since 2021. Timothy D. McKenrick is challenging Bertoglio for the Republican nomination.

District 76
Incumbent Democrat Donavon Hawk has represented the 76th district since 2021.

District 77 
Incumbent Democrat Sara Novak has represented the 79th district since 2021.

District 78
Incumbent Republican Gregory Frazer has represented the 78th District since 2021. Steven D. Grant is challenging Frazer for the Republican nomination.

District 79
Incumbent Democrat Robert Farris-Olsen has represented the 79th district since 2019. Farris-Olsen isn't seeking re-election.

District 80
Incumbent Republican Becky Beard has represented the 80th District since 2017.

Districts 81-100

District 81
Incumbent Democrat Mary Caferro has represented the 81st District since 2019. Caferro is running for re-election in the 82nd district. Melissa Romano, Jake C. Troyer, and Jacob B. Torgerson are seeking the Democratic nomination. Charlie Hull and Jill Sark are seeking the Republican nomination.

District 82
Incumbent Democrat Moffie Funk has represented the 82nd district since 2015. Funk is term-limited and can't seek re-election. 81st district representative Mary Caferro and Craig Sundberg are seeking the Democratic nomination.

District 83
Incumbent Democratic Minority Leader Kim Abbott has represented the 83rd district since 2017.

District 84
Incumbent Democrat Mary Ann Dunwell has represented the 84th District since 2015. Dunwell is term-limited and is retiring to run for the Montana Senate. State Senate Minority Leader Jill Cohenour and Noah J. Horan are seeking the Democratic nomination. Kurt J. Aughney, Keith Pigman, and Kaitlyn Ruch are seeking the Republican nomination.

District 85
Incumbent Republican Michele Binkley has represented the 85th District since 2021.

District 86
Incumbent Republican David Bedey has represented the 86th District since 2019. Jeffrey B. Jones is challenging Bedey for the Republican nomination.

District 87
Incumbent Republican Ron Marshall has represented the 87th District since 2021.

District 88
Incumbent Republican Sharon Greef has represented the 88th District since 2019. Greef isn't seeking re-election. Alan Lackey and Wayne Rusk are seeking the Republican nomination.

District 89
Incumbent Democrat Katie Sullivan has represented the 89th District since 2019.

District 90
Incumbent Democrat Marilyn Marler has represented the 90th District since 2019.

District 91
Incumbent Democrat Connie Keogh has represented the 91st District since 2019.

District 92
Incumbent Republican Mike Hopkins has represented the 92nd District since 2017.

District 93
Incumbent Republican Joe Read has represented the 93rd district since 2019.

District 94
Incumbent Democrat Tom France has represented the 94th District since 2021.

District 95
Incumbent Democrat Danny Tenenbaum has represented the 95th District since 2021. Tenenbaum isn't seeking re-election.

District 96
Jonathan Karlen won the 2022 Democratic Primary election against  Linda Swanson and defeated Republican incumbent Kathy Whitman in the 2022 general election.

District 97
Incumbent Republican Brad Tschida has represented the 97th district since 2015. Tschida is term-limited and retiring to run for the Montana Senate. Michael Burkes and Lyn Hellegaard are seeking the Republican nomination.

District 98
Incumbent Democrat Willis Curdy has represented the 98th district since 2015. Curdy is term-limited and is retiring to run for the Montana Senate. Bob Carter and Andy Nelson are seeking the Democratic nomination.

District 99
Incumbent Democrat Mark Thane has represented the 99th District since 2021.

District 100
Incumbent Democrat Andrea Olsen has represented the 100th District since 2015. Olsen is term-limited and is retiring to run for the Montana Senate. David Severson and Zooey Zephyr are seeking the Democratic nomination.

References

2022 Montana elections
Montana House
November 2022 events in the United States
Montana House of Representatives elections